Frank Charles Budka (born March 20, 1942) is a former American football quarterback for Pompano Beach High School in Florida, and the University of Notre Dame.  He also played professionally for one season in the NFL with the Los Angeles Rams as a safety, having been drafted and subsequently released by the Chicago Bears.

References

1942 births
American football quarterbacks
Notre Dame Fighting Irish football players
Living people